Behrend may refer to:

People
 Behrend (surname)

Places
 Penn State Erie (Behrend), Pennsylvania
 Penn State Behrend
 Arboretum at Penn State Behrend

Other
 Comcast Corp. v. Behrend, a United States Supreme Court case

See also
 Behrends
 Behrendt